The 1983 NFL season was the 64th regular season of the National Football League. The Colts played their final season in Baltimore  before the team's relocation to Indianapolis the following season. The season ended with Super Bowl XVIII when the Los Angeles Raiders defeated the Washington Redskins 38–9 at Tampa Stadium in Florida.

Player movement

Transactions

Trades
May 2, 1983: The Baltimore Colts traded John Elway for Chris Hinton, backup quarterback Mark Herrmann, and a first-round pick in the 1984 Draft, which turned into offensive lineman Ron Solt.

Retirements
January 11, 1983: Wide receiver and four-time Super Bowl champion Lynn Swann retires.

Draft

The 1983 NFL Draft was held from April 26 to 27, 1983 at New York City's Sheraton Hotel. With the first pick, the Baltimore Colts selected quarterback John Elway from Stanford University.

Major rule changes
In the last 30 seconds of a half (but not overtime), with the defensive team behind with no more time outs, a defensive foul cannot prevent the half from ending except for the normal options that are available to the offensive team.
Pass interference will not be called if there was incidental contact, or if when players make simultaneous attempts to catch, tip, block, or bat the ball.
Players may not use a helmet, that is no longer worn by anyone, as a weapon to strike or hit an opponent; they risk disqualification if they do. This rule was instituted after Raiders defensive end Lyle Alzado swung a helmet at New York Jets tackle Chris Ward during a playoff game the previous season.

1983 deaths
June 25, 1983: Larry Gordon, the Miami Dolphins first round pick in the 1976 NFL Draft, died from heart failure
October 31, 1983: George Halas, the owner of the Chicago Bears dies of cancer at the age of 88 years old.
December 16, 1983 Doug Kotar, Running Back for the New York Giants, died from an inoperable brain tumor.

Division races
The two wild cards would meet for the right to face whichever of the three division winners had the best overall record. The tiebreaker rules were based on head-to-head competition, followed by division records, common opponents records, and conference play.

National Football Conference

American Football Conference

Regular season

Scheduling formula

Highlights of the 1983 season included:
Thanksgiving: Two games were played on Thursday, November 24, featuring Pittsburgh at Detroit and St. Louis at Dallas, with Detroit and Dallas winning.

Final standings

Tiebreakers
Los Angeles Raiders was the first AFC seed over Miami based on head-to-head victory (1–0).
Seattle was the first AFC Wild Card ahead of Denver based on better division record (5–3 to Broncos’ 3–5) after Cleveland was eliminated from the three-way tie based on head-to-head record (Seattle and Denver 2–1 to Browns’ 0–2).
New England finished ahead of Buffalo in the AFC East based on head-to-head sweep (2–0).
Baltimore finished ahead of N.Y. Jets in the AFC East based on better conference record (5–9, .357 to Jets’ 4–8, .333).
San Diego finished ahead of Kansas City in the AFC West based on head-to-head sweep (2–0).
Minnesota ended up in fourth place in the NFC Central after being eliminated from the three-way tie based on conference record (Chicago 7–7 and Green Bay 6–6 to Vikings’ 4–8).
Green Bay finished ahead of Chicago in the NFC Central based on better record against common opponents (4–4 to Bears’ 3–5).

Playoffs

Notable events
Kansas City Chiefs running back Joe Delaney dies after attempting to rescue three boys who were drowning in a makeshift swimming pool at a construction site in Monroe, Louisiana.
 LA Raiders Super Bowl win would be the AFC's last win until the 1997 season when the Denver Broncos defeated the Green Bay Packers.

Milestones
The following players set all-time records during the season:

Statistical leaders

Team

Awards

Coaching changes

Offseason
Atlanta Falcons: Dan Henning replaced the fired Leeman Bennett.
Buffalo Bills: Kay Stephenson replaced Chuck Knox, who left the team to join the Seattle Seahawks.
Kansas City Chiefs: Marv Levy was fired and replaced by John Mackovic.
New York Giants: Ray Perkins was replaced by Bill Parcells.
New York Jets: Walt Michaels resigned and was replaced by Joe Walton.
Los Angeles Rams: Ray Malavasi was fired and replaced by John Robinson.
Philadelphia Eagles: Dick Vermeil resigned and was replaced by Marion Campbell.
Seattle Seahawks: Chuck Knox joined the Seahawks after resigning from the Bills. Seattle had fired Jack Patera after the team lost their first two games in 1982. Mike McCormack, the team's director of football operations, took over as interim for the remainder of that season.

In-season
Houston Oilers: Ed Biles was fired after the team lost their first six games. Defensive coordinator Chuck Studley took over as interim.

Stadium changes
Schaefer Stadium is renamed Sullivan Stadium after New England Patriots founder and owner Billy Sullivan

Uniform changes
 The New Orleans Saints' jersey numbers were slightly modified, adding a thin inner border which matched the jersey color between the gold outer border and the number itself, similar to the numbers on the San Diego Chargers' jerseys. 
 The Seattle Seahawks revised their jerseys for the first time since joining the NFL in 1976. The new jerseys moved the TV numbers from the sleeves to the shoulders, with the helmet logo duplicated on the sleeves. Face masks also changed from gray to blue.

Television
This was the second year under the league's five-year broadcast contracts with ABC, CBS, and NBC to televise Monday Night Football, the NFC package, and the AFC package, respectively.

O. J. Simpson replaced Fran Tarkenton as ABC's fill-in color commentator. Howard Cosell then ignited racial controversy during the broadcast of the September 5 MNF game between the Dallas Cowboys and Washington Redskins when his commentary on Alvin Garrett, an African American wide receiver for Washington, included a reference to "That little monkey". The fallout contributed to Cosell's decision to leave MNF after the season.

Regular season game not broadcast by Network TV

References

NFL Record and Fact Book
NFL History 1981–1990  (Last accessed December 4, 2005)
Total Football: The Official Encyclopedia of the National Football League
NFL Salaries, 1983, offense
NFL Salaries, 1983, defense

1983
National Football League